Nagolla may refer to:

 Nagolla (7°22'N 80°52'E), a village in Sri Lanka
 Nagolla (7°27'N 80°37'E), a village in Sri Lanka